Heptacene is an organic compound and a polycyclic aromatic hydrocarbon and the seventh member of the acene or polyacene family of linear fused benzene rings. This compound has long been pursued by chemists because of its potential interest in electronic applications and was first synthesized but not cleanly isolated in 2006. Heptacene was finally fully characterized in bulk by researchers in Germany and the United States in 2017.

The final step is a photochemical decarbonylization with a 1,2-dione bridge extruded as carbon monoxide. In solution heptacene is not formed because it is very unstable being a reactive DA diene and quickly reacts with oxygen or forms dimers. When on the other hand the dione precursor is dissolved in a PMMA matrix first, heptacene can be studied by spectroscopy. Heptacene has been studied spectroscopically at cryogenic temperatures in a matrix. When dissolved in sulfuric acid the heptacene dication is reported to be stable at room-temperature for more than a year in absence of oxygen.
"[Isolated] solid heptacene has a half-life time of several weeks at room temperature."

Derivatives 

7,16-Bis(tris(trimethylsilyl)silylethynyl)heptacene was synthesized in 2005. This compound is stable in the solid state for a week but decomposes in contact with air. Its synthesis started from anthraquinone and naphthalene-2,3-dicarboxaldehyde. More stable substituted heptacenes have been reported: with stabilizing p-(t-butyl)thiophenyl substituents (Figure 1) and with phenyl and triisopropylsilylethynyl groups (Figure 2).

References

Acenes
Polycyclic aromatic hydrocarbons
Substances discovered in the 2000s